Nick Phipps may refer to:
 Nick Phipps (rugby union) (born 1989), Australian rugby union player
 Nick Phipps (bobsleigh) (born 1952), British bobsledder